Marko J. Tuomainen (born April 25, 1972) is a Finnish former professional ice hockey player who played in the National Hockey League and SM-liiga. He played for KalPa, HIFK, Espoo Blues, Edmonton Oilers, Los Angeles Kings, and New York Islanders.

He last played in the Mestis with Kiekko-Vantaa during the 2011–12 season.

Career statistics

Regular season and playoffs

International

Awards and honours

References

External links 

1972 births
Living people
EHC Biel players
Bridgeport Sound Tigers players
Cape Breton Oilers players
Clarkson Golden Knights men's ice hockey players
Edmonton Oilers draft picks
Edmonton Oilers players
Espoo Blues players
Finnish ice hockey left wingers
Hamilton Bulldogs (AHL) players
HIFK (ice hockey) players
KalPa players
Kiekko-Vantaa players
KooKoo players
SC Langenthal players
Lausanne HC players
Los Angeles Kings players
Lowell Lock Monsters players
New York Islanders players
People from Kuopio
HC Pustertal Wölfe players
SCL Tigers players
AHCA Division I men's ice hockey All-Americans
Sportspeople from North Savo